The World Port Index (PUB 150) contains a tabular listing of thousands of ports throughout the world, describing their location, characteristics, known facilities, and available services.  Of particular interest are the applicable volume of Sailing Directions and the number of the harbor chart.  The table is arranged geographically, with an alphabetical index.

The selection of these places is based on criteria established by the National Geospatial-Intelligence Agency.  They are not random choices. The applicable chart and Sailing Directions is given for each place listed.

In order to present such a large amount of diversified data in a single volume of convenient size, a simple code is used to indicate certain types of information. The code symbols are explained at the top of each page of text.

This book is corrected by the National Geospatial-Intelligence Agency.

Data Availability
In addition to the published text edition of the World Port Index, the National Geospatial-Intelligence Agency also makes the data available in tabular and spatial formats. This includes Microsoft Access database and Esri Shapefile formats. Archived publications are also available with past Access databases dating to 2000 and Shapefiles dating to 2010. The data is available from the National Geospatial-Intelligence Agency's World Port Index webpage.

Sources
The text of this article originated from the preface of the World Port Index and section 413 of The American Practical Navigator.  These documents are produced by the government of the United States of America and in the public domain.

See also

American Practical Navigator
Coast Pilots
Distances Between Ports
List of Lights
Local Notice to Mariners
Notice to Mariners
Sailing Directions

References

External links
 Chapter 4: Nautical Publications - from the online edition of Nathaniel Bowditch's American Practical Navigator
 World Port Index at National Geospatial-Intelligence Agency
 https://web.archive.org/web/20070304011545/http://www.nga.mil/portal/site/maritime/?epi_menuItemID=f00695a20370bb625b2a7fbd3227a759&epi_menuID=35ad5b8aabcefa1a0fc133443927a759&epi_baseMenuID=e106a3b5e50edce1fec24fd73927a759

Navigation
Hydrography
Lists of ports
Water transport-related lists